The basketball tournaments of NCAA Season 87 are the Philippines' National Collegiate Athletic Association tournaments for basketball in its 2011–12 season. University of Perpetual Help System DALTA hosted the season, starting with an opening ceremony held on July 2, 2011 followed by a triple-header game. Games then are subsequently being held at Filoil Flying V Arena, with seniors' games on Wednesdays, Fridays and select Monday games aired by Studio 23.

In the seniors' tournament, the San Beda Red Lions successfully defended their championship, sweeping the San Sebastian Stags in a rematch of the last two championship series. Both teams started undefeated, with San Sebastian winning the first round finale against the Red Lions, finally ending San Beda's league record 26-game winning streak. The Stags extended their winning streak to 15 games until they were defeated by the Letran Knights. The Red Lions, after being beaten by the JRU Heavy Bombers, ended the second round with a six-game winning run. They beat San Sebastian in the last elimination round game to force a playoff for the first seed, a game they subsequently won. The Red Lions then met JRU in the semifinals, which also had their own six-game winning run after a 3–9 start. The Red Lions won, advancing to the finals for the sixth consecutive year. The Stags and the Knights met in the other semifinal, where the Knights extended the series to a deciding game; the Stags won on Game 2 to qualify for the finals anew. In the Finals, San Beda won Game 1 convincingly, while the Stags missed on a chance to force overtime on Game 2 to give San Beda their second consecutive title. Dave Marcelo was named the Finals MVP.

In the juniors' tournament, the San Beda Red Cubs won all 18 elimination round games to qualify outright to the finals with the thrice to beat advantage. The EAC-ICA Brigadiers, a team under probation, qualified for their first NCAA playoff appearance; they were beaten in the first round of the stepladder series by the La Salle Green Hills Greenies to face the Letran Squires in the next round. The Greenies led for much of the game until they quelled an end-game rally by Letran to clinch the school's first NCAA finals berth. The Greenies prevented a Red Cubs season sweep, winning Game 1 of the finals.

Preseason
The San Sebastian Stags announced that their former coach Turo Valenzona had been named as their new head coach, four months after Ato Agustin left to coach the San Miguel Beermen in the Philippine Basketball Association. Valenzona had previously coached the Stags in the 1990s, winning four consecutive championships from 1993 to 1996, with the 1996 season finishing undefeated. Valenzona would be the league's oldest head coach at 68 years old.

Paul Nuilan and Marlon Gomez, the two players from the UPHSD Altas who were not allowed to play last year, were cleared to play this season. This gave coach Boris Aldeguer optimism for the upcoming season.

In the preseason tournaments, defending champions San Beda Red Lions were defeated by the UAAP champions Ateneo Blue Eagles in the final of the Filoil Flying V Pre-Season Cup 75–56. The Red Cubs defeated the Philippines under-16 basketball team 79–70 to win the juniors event, with Francis Abarcar being named most valuable player. San Beda's Garvo Lanete and Yousef Taha of the Mapúa Cardinals were named members of the mythical team. In the Father Martin Cup, Mapua was defeated by the NU Bulldogs of the UAAP in the seniors' final, 87–83 in overtime.

The league announced a partnership with SM Supermalls in marketing the league; next season's basketball tournaments are to be held at the yet-to-be-finished SM Arena, as the arena is accessible to most of the member schools. Also, in an effort to "go green", the league announced that the tickets used for the basketball tournaments will be produced under an environment-friendly system. The creation of ticket-on-demand system prevents the accumulation of unsold tickets that are stored every year, and reduces the amount of paper used.

The UPHSD Altas announced on June 27 that head coach Boris Aldeguer resigned. While no reason was given, sources of the Philippine Daily Inquirer stated that the non-inclusion of a UPHSD player by the NCAA board was the cause of his resignation. Aldeguer's assistant Jimwell Gican was named as the new head coach. While the NCAA board allowed UPHSD player Marlon Gomez to play after sitting out last season to residency, UPHSD president Anthony Tamayo announced that he will not be entered during the games; this also came after the board disallowed another player, Paul Nuilan, who allegedly misrepresented documents on his transfer from Far Eastern University to Letran to Perpetual. Gomez was almost cleared to play for Perpetual in 2010 until JRU showed documents that he had enrolled there after transferring from Philippine Christian University.

The San Sebastian Stags announced that head coach Turo Valenzona was elevated as team consultant, while Topex Robinson was named as the new head coach days prior to the opening. Robinson was Valenzona's player during San Sebastian's 1996 title run and won another title with the Stags in 1997 before turning professional.

Seniors' tournament
The seniors' tournaments began on July 2, 2011 after the opening ceremonies at the Araneta Coliseum, Quezon City. Thereafter, the rest of the first round games are currently held at the Filoil Flying V Arena, San Juan.

Teams

Elimination round

Team standings

Match-up results

Scores

Postseason teams

San Beda Red Lions
With Borgie Hermida leaving the team and Sudan Daniel not playing due to an injury, the Red Lions had to find other ways to keep its championship form. Fresh from last season's sweep, the Red Lions had an 8-game winning streak to start the season adding up to a 26-game winning streak. The streak was ended by the San Sebastian Stags, last year's runner-up. With the Red Lions hoping that it would be the only loss they will have this season, JRU gave them their second loss after a 2-week break. With that loss, the Red Lions made sure they won't have another loss this season. They defeated the Stags on the last day of elimination with both teams tied for the top spot. A playoff was held and the Red Lions won which gave them the top seed and the Stags settling for second. This was another great year for the school as they finished as champions and the juniors team also ending up as champions giving them a back-to-back double championship title.

San Sebastian Stags
Last season's runner-up was seeking for redemption against the defending champions, the Red Lions. The Stags started the season with an impressive 15-game winning streak only to be ended by the Letran Knights. Because of this, some fans thought that the 85th season would repeat as for the saying "history will repeat itself". Many were hoping that even though the Red Lions will take the top seed, the Stags will still be the champions. The loss of Borgie Hermida and Sudan Daniel made them confident that they will defeat the Red Lions in any game. They gave the Red Lions their first loss since the 85th season with the so-called Pinatubo Trio contributing most of the team's points. The second round meet-up with the Red Lions was pretty disappointing for the school with the fans confident they will take it also like they did in the first round meeting. The Pinatubo Trio was not in action during that game and their performance was pretty disappointing with the game ending at 70-91 in favor of the Red Lions. Before that meeting, the Stags already had its first loss given by the Knights with the game ending at 81-82 with overtime. As the Stags were tied up with the Red Lions for the top spot, a playoff was held with the Red Lions winning it.

Letran Knights
With the Letran Knights finishing with a disappointing 5th place last season, the team had to find depth from all the players. Last season was their first time not being in the final four in years as they are seen as one of the dominant teams, it was pretty embarrassing. They started the season with a 3-game winning streak to be ended by the Stags with a 62-71 game in favor of the opponent. Another loss was given to them by the defending champions, the Red Lions, with a lopsided 62-77 game. Although they weren't upset that they lost to these teams, th second round gave them some disappointments. They lost to the UPHSD Altas, a team seen as one of the weakest teams as they always finish in last every season recently. Although in their next game, they won against the Stags giving them their first loss of the season. The team might be celebrating from this win, their next game was against San Beda. Again, they lost to the Red Lions with their coach frustrated how they can win against the Stags but not against the Red Lions. They ended the season with a satisfactory 3rd-place finish with a record of 14-4 and a loss from San Beda.

JRU Heavy Bombers
The Bombers started the season with a back-to-back loss from the San Sebastian Stags and the Arellano Chiefs. Their first win is against the EAC Generals, the team that finished in last place this season. With the Bombers finishing 3rd place last season, the Bombers was still looking for an end to their 38-year title drought, the longest in the history of the NCAA. They were defeated by the Altas in their fifth game, frustrating their head coach and the school shocked. This was followed by another back-to-back losses from CSB Blazers and the defending champions, the San Beda Red Lions. Their first round was very disappointing and isn't showing the light for ending their title drought. Their second was, fortunately, was pretty impressive. They might have started the round with a 3-game losing streak but countered it with a 6-game winning streak up until the end of the eliminations, in it is a win against the Red Lions giving the Lions their second and last loss in the season. They finished in fourth place but this wasn't enough to end their 38-year title drought.

First-seed playoff

Bracket

Semifinals
San Beda and San Sebastian have the twice-to-beat advantage. They only have to win once, while their opponents, twice, to progress.

San Beda vs JRU

San Sebastian vs Letran

Finals

Finals Most Valuable Player: 
Coach of the Year:

Awards
The end-of-season awards were given prior to Game 1 of the seniors' finals at the Smart Araneta Coliseum.
Most Valuable Player: 
Mythical Five:

 

Rookie of the Year: 
Defensive Player of the Year: 
Most Improved Player:

Players of the Week

Juniors' tournament
The juniors' tournament started on July 4 with all games being held at the Filoil Flying V Arena.

Elimination round

Team standings

Match-up results

Scores

Bracket

Stepladder semifinals

First round

Second round

Finals
San Beda has to win twice, while LSGH has to win thrice, to win the championship series.

Finals Most Valuable Player: 
Coach of the Year:

Awards
Season Most Valuable Player: 
Rookie of the Year: 
Mythical Five:

Most Improved Player: 
Defensive Player of the Year:

See also
UAAP Season 74 basketball tournaments

References

External links
NCAA Philippines 87th Season

87
2011–12 in Philippine college basketball